Cyperus ajax is a species of sedge that is native to parts of Africa.

The species was first formally described by the botanist Charles Baron Clarke in 1901.

See also
 List of Cyperus species

References

ajax
Taxa named by Charles Baron Clarke
Plants described in 1901
Flora of Burundi
Flora of Zambia
Flora of Uganda
Flora of Kenya
Flora of Malawi